XHUACC-FM is a Mexican college radio station owned by the Universidad Autónoma del Carmen.

History
XHUACC received its permit in February 2006, and at 11:15pm on December 12, 2006, test transmissions began for the new station on 88.9 FM.

References

Radio stations in Campeche
University radio stations in Mexico